Regional elections were held in France on 14 and 21 March 2010. At stake were the presidencies of each of France's 26 régions, which, though they do not have legislative autonomy, manage sizable budgets.

The elections resulted in significant gains for the French Socialist Party (PS) and its allies, who went on to control 21 of the 22 regions of Metropolitan France.

Situation

Following the 2004 elections, which saw an historic victory of the left, largely led by the PS, only Alsace and Corsica were still run by the UMP. The left made gains in the national level in 2007 (presidential and legislative), and performed strongly in the 2008 municipal and cantonal elections. In metropolitan France, all incumbent left-wing Presidents are running for a second term in an election which generally favours popular incumbents and anti-government voting. Yet, the left is divided between the PS and Europe Ecology, which performed very strongly in the 2009 European elections.

The right, principally the UMP and its allies, were victorious in the 2007 presidential and legislative elections and also in the 2009 European elections. The right is favoured by its unity, notably by its new alliances with Philippe de Villiers' Movement for France and Frédéric Nihous' Hunting, Fishing, Nature, Tradition. Yet, with this newfound unity, the right lacks a large vote reserve in the eventuality of a second round, where it could count only on partial support from supporters of the centrist MoDem and the far-right FN. In addition, the growing unpopularity of President Nicolas Sarkozy could have hurt the right in an election where voters tend to sanction the incumbent government in Paris.

On the far-right, The National Front has been weakened by its previous electoral failures since 2007, but nevertheless remains a significant force in French politics.

Main political parties and strategies

Left

The parties to the left of the PS were divided over their electoral strategy. On one side, the far-left and the New Anticapitalist Party (NPA) refuse to participate in an executive led by the PS; but the French Communist Party (PCF) wishes to continue its participation in a number of executives led by the PS.

The PCF finally decided to continue the Left Front with the Left Party (PG), first tested in the 2009 European elections. These lists would be independent in the first round, but would support (or merge) with a Socialist-led list in the runoff on the condition that the centrist MoDem doesn't do likewise. Yet, the final decision on the matter was transferred to the regional party members. In 17 of 22 regions, members approved the decision of an expanded Left Front; but in five regions, PCF members opted for a first-round alliance with the PS. These regions are Burgundy, Champagne-Ardenne, Lorraine, Lower Normandy and Brittany. In these regions, however, dissident Communists joined with the NPA and the PG to create independent lists for the first round.

The NPA's members voted on the party's strategy in December, and the independence strategy of the majority received support from only 36.3% of members, with 31.5% voting to continue discussions with the PCF-PG in the aim of obtaining a deal, and 28.5% rejected all talks with the FG. Finally, the NPA's executive opted to support independent lists of the "left of the left" in all regions in the first round and agreed to 'technical fusions' with other left-wing lists in the runoff (such as Left Front lists), without agreeing to participate in regional executives. In 11 regions, the NPA will fight alone, notably against a Left Front list. However, in three regions – Languedoc-Roussillon, Limousin and Pays de la Loire, the NPA opted to support a Left Front list by the first round. Finally, in three of the five regions (except Brittany and Lorraine) where the PCF opted to support the PS by the first round, lists with the support of the PG were formed.

Contrarily to 2004, when it had run common lists with the LCR, the Workers' Struggle is running independent lists in all regions in 2010.

The Socialist Party was not able to renew the unity of the left behind it by the first round like in 2004. It received some support from dissident ecologists, as well as the support of the French Communist Party (PCF) in four regions (but not the support of the PCF's ally, the PG). It does have the support of the Left Radical Party in all regions except Brittany. In Poitou-Charentes, Ségolène Royal integrated five MoDem candidates on her lists.

All the party's incumbents, except for the controversial Georges Frêche (already expelled from the party in 2005), were re-nominated. The PS, with Hélène Mandroux, will oppose Georges Frêche's list in Languedoc-Roussillon.

Ecologists

Strong from its excellent result in the European elections, the Europe Ecology coalition was renewed around the Greens and associated parties and movements. Europe Ecology will run independently in all regions, with the intention of supporting the left in runoffs. However, the party's ultimate goal would be to wrest control of a major region, such as Île-de-France from the PS. The coalition's candidates include the researcher Philippe Meirieu, magistrate Laurence Vichnievsky, the rural activist François Dufour or Augustin Legrand of the homeless' association les Enfants de Don Quichotte.

The Independent Ecological Alliance (AEI), after winning 3.6% in the European elections, is running independent lists in 10 regions. The AEI signed electoral deals with Europe Ecology in Alsace and Midi-Pyrénées, with the MoDem in Auvergne, Franche-Comté, Pays de la Loire and Poitou-Charentes.

Corinne Lepage's Cap21, despite being a component of the MoDem, the party ended up supporting Europe Ecology over the MoDem.

Centre

After the deceiving result of the European elections, François Bayrou's MoDem decided to run autonomous lists in all regions by the first round but chose to clarify its runoff strategy only after the first round. However, due to Bayrou's strong opposition to Nicolas Sarkozy, it is deemed unlikely that any MoDem lists will merge with UMP lists for the runoffs.

The Presidential Majority

Nicolas Sarkozy was successful in his attempts to push for the unity of all the Presidential Majority by the first round around the Union for a Popular Movement (UMP) and its allies, notably the New Centre and the Movement for France. Three cabinet ministers and five secretaries of states are leading regional lists, and eight other cabinet members are present on the majority's lists.

The New Centre obtained the top candidacy in Burgundy (with François Sauvadet) and Nord-Pas-de-Calais (with Valérie Létard), but not in Lower Normandy.

Despite the right's relative unity, there are a number of small dissidents lists in a number of regions.

Far-right

The National Front ran lists in all metropolitan regions. Jean-Marie Le Pen was a candidate in Provence-Alpes-Côte d'Azur and his daughter Marine Le Pen was a candidate in the Nord-Pas-de-Calais.

In Provence-Alpes-Côte d'Azur, the ex-MPF and ex-FN mayor of Orange Jacques Bompard was leading a list named "Ligue du Sud", and there was a similar "Ligue du midi" in Languedoc-Roussillon.

Furthermore, around the Party of France or smaller dissident parties, there were a number of dissident far-right lists in some regions.

Polling

Nationwide polling

National results

Among the 1880 seats, 41 were attributed at the first round (Guadeloupe) and 1839 at the second round.

First round

Abstention : 53.67%

Second round

Abstention : 48.79%

Regional results

The following tables show the results in the first round of voting which took place on 14 March 2010 and, where applicable, in the second round of voting which took place on 21 March 2010.

Alsace

Aquitaine

Auvergne

Brittany

Burgundy

Centre

Champagne-Ardenne

Corsica

Franche-Comté

Guadeloupe

Guiana

Île-de-France

La Réunion

Languedoc-Roussillon

Limousin

Lorraine

Lower Normandy

Martinique

Midi-Pyrénées

Nord-Pas-de-Calais

Pays de la Loire

Picardy

Poitou-Charentes

Provence-Alpes-Côte d'Azur

Rhône-Alpes

Upper Normandy

See also
Regional Council

References

External links
After regional elections, should Sarkozy panic? Analysis by Radio France Internationale in English
Election-Politique Regional Elections since 1986 (in french)

2010
2010 elections in France